The National is a team handball tournament to determine the Men's and Women's National Champion from the United States. At the men's side there exist an Elite and Open Division. In years with many teams, the Open Division is split in Division I and II.

History
The record champion at the Men's side is the New York Athletic Club with a total of 20 titles. Since the  Men's Elite Division was established, New York City THC holds the most titles (7), followed by New York Athletic Club (6). The current US men reigning champion is San Francisco CalHeat. At the women's side, Chicago Inter HC holds 6 titles. The current US women reigning champion is New York City THC.

Men's
Until 2000 the Open Division was the tournament to select the national champion. After the Elite Division was established.
The overall record champion is the New York Athletic Club with 20 titles.

Men's Elite Division

Record champion is New York City THC with 7 titles each.

Men's Open Division I

Record champion is the New York Athletic Club with, at minimum, 8 titles; the club has also the most repeat titles—3 titles.

Men's Open Division II

Record champions are the Air Force Falcons and West Point each with 2 titles.

Women's Open Division

Record champion is the Chicago Inter HC with 6 titles the club has also the most continues titles with three.

Medal count

Men's Medal count

Women's Medal count

Total Medal count

References